Pink Media Group is one of the leading media corporations in Southeast Europe. Its primary area of activity is the production of television programming which has resulted in the creation and distribution of 60 branded, different genre TV channels led by the highest rated TV channel in the region, TV PINK.

TV channels
In Serbia: 
 RTV Pink  - national frequency
Specialized cable television channels:

1 RED TV
2 VESTI TV
3 Pink Action
4 Pink Bravo Music
5 Pink Classic
6 Pink Comedy
7 Pink Crime & Mystery
15 Pink Extra
16 Pink Family
17 Pink Fashion
18 Pink Fight Network 
19 Pink Film
20 Pink Folk
21 Pink Folk 2
22 Pink Hits 1
23 Pink Hits 2
24 Pink Horror
25 Pink Kids
26 Pink Koncert
27 Pink Kuvar
28 Pink Life Style
29 Pink Movies
30 Pink Music
31 Pink Music 2
32 Pink n Roll
33 Pink Parada
34 Pink Pedia
35 Pink Plus
36 Pink Premium
37 Pink Reality
38 Pink Romance
39 Pink Sci Fi & Fantasy
40 Pink Serije
41 Pink Show
42 Pink Soap
43 Pink Super Kids 
44 Pink Thriller
45 Pink Western
46 Pink World
47 Pink World Cinema
48 Pink Zabava

References

External links

 RBA Serbia
 Communications Regulatory Agency of Bosnia and Herzegovina
 RTV Pink
 Pink BiH

Television stations in Serbia
Television channels in North Macedonia